Qom or QOM may refer to:

Places in Iran 
 Qom, a major city
 Qom County
 Qom Province
 Qom River
 Qom, Razavi Khorasan, a village

Other uses 
 Qom people, of South America
 Qom language
 QOM, or Queen of the mountains, a title in cycling races or certain sports apps (e.g. Strava).
 QEMU Object Model (Computing: QOM), framework for registering user creatable types and instantiating objects from those types.

See also 

 Qum (disambiguation)